Harold Washington College is a community college, part of the City Colleges of Chicago system of the City of Chicago, in Illinois, United States. It is located in the downtown "Loop" area of the City, near the series of parks along the lakefront of Lake Michigan, centered at 30 East Lake Street. Founded in 1962 as Loop College, the college was renamed for the first African American to be elected Mayor of Chicago, Harold Washington, (1922–1987), after his sudden death in office in November 1987.

History
Harold Washington College was dedicated to Mayor Washington's memory in a ceremony on April 19, 1988, five months after his passing. Elements of the City-Wide College were joined to the Harold Washington College when the former was closed in 1993. The Dawson Technical Institute was under the auspices of HWC from 1993 to 1995, at which point it became part of Kennedy-King College, another of the City Colleges of Chicago.

From 1987 to 1993, one of its buildings by the El train (albeit with its sign still reading Loop College) was visible in the opening credits of the ABC sitcom Perfect Strangers.

Mission
Harold Washington College is a learning-centered, urban institution of higher education offering accessible and affordable opportunities for academic advancement, career development and personal enrichment. The College is committed to upholding high institutional and academic standards and to understanding and improving student learning.

Programs
HWC as a community college offers two year "Associates" degrees in a wide variety of majors and provides transfer assistance to local four-year upper division colleges and universities. In 2005, it finished a series of substantial renovations with the help of a City bond initiative to be approved by the voters  that was the first of its kind in support of a City Colleges institution.

Harold Washington College was the only site in the City of Chicago for taxicab driver certification but now functions as the center of business, entrepreneurship and professional services for all of the City Colleges of Chicago. Harold Washington College is also the Chicago site for the investment/financial firm Goldman Sachs "10,000 Small Businesses" program, which provides Chicago area small business owners with greater access to business education, financial capital and business support services.

In 2004, Harold Washington College established a 'Great Books" program.  The school also has an agreement with private institution, Shimer College, another "Great Books" curriculum college in Chicago, to allow Harold Washington students to take classes at Shimer while paying City Colleges level of tuition.

Accredited by the Higher Learning Commission of the North Central Association of Colleges and Schools, Harold Washington College is also approved by the Illinois Community College Board, the Illinois Board of Higher Education and the Illinois State Board of Education. In 2013, the Council for Higher Education Accreditation recognized Harold Washington College's assessments of student learning outcomes, which have influenced course sequencing, pre-requisites, teaching strategies, faculty development and institutional policies, with the 2013 CHEA Award for Outstanding Institutional Practice in Student Learning Outcomes.

Notable alumni
Minnie Riperton, attended Loop College for less than 21 days
Walid Shoebat
Darling Squire

References

External links
HWC website

City Colleges of Chicago
Central Chicago
Community colleges in Illinois
Educational institutions established in 1962